Alan Fudge (February 27, 1944 – October 10, 2011) was an American actor known for his roles in four television programs, Man from Atlantis, Eischied, Paper Dolls and Bodies of Evidence, along with a recurring role on 7th Heaven.

Early years 
Fudge was born in Wichita, Kansas. He moved to Tucson, Arizona, at the age of five. He acted with Mary MacMurtrie's Children's Theater in Tucson and with the Tucson Little Theater. He graduated from the University of Arizona with a major in theater. He received the university's Best Actor Award in two seasons worked with the Globe Theater in San Diego during one summer.

Career 
On television, Fudge portrayed Lou Dalton in the drama 7th Heaven, C. W. Crawford in the adventure series Man from Atlantis, and Jim Kimbrough in the crime drama Eischied.

Fudge appeared in many television movies based on popular series, such as Columbo: Columbo Goes to the Guillotine, Columbo: Columbo Goes to College, Matlock: The Witness Killings, and Murder, She Wrote: A Story to Die For. He had a turn as the title character in the M*A*S*H episode "Quo Vadis, Captain Chandler?," which was nominated for a Humanitas Prize.

Films in which he appeared include Airport 1975 (1974), Bug (1975), Capricorn One (1978), Chapter Two (1979), The Border (1982), Brainstorm (1983), The Natural (1984), My Demon Lover (1987) and Edward Scissorhands (1990).

Fudge's work on stage included performing at the Charles Playhouse in Boston. For three years, he acted with the APA-Phoenix Theatre. He appeared on Broadway, including being part of the original cast of War and Peace at the Lyceum Theatre in 1967. His other credits on Broadway included Hamlet (1969), The Show Off (1968), Pantagleize (1968), The Cherry Orchard (1968), You Can't Take It With You (1967), The Wild Duck (1967), We, Comrades Three (1966), and The School for Scandal (1966).

Death 
Fudge died in Los Angeles at age 67, as a result of lung and liver cancer, on October 10, 2011.

Filmography

References

External links
 
 
 

1944 births
2011 deaths
Male actors from Kansas
American male film actors
American male television actors
Actors from Wichita, Kansas
Deaths from cancer in California
Tucson High School alumni
University of Arizona alumni